Mapp is a surname. Notable people with the surname include:

Anna K. Mapp (born 1970), American chemist
Arthur Mapp, British judoka
Charles Mapp (1903–1978), British politician
Corie Mapp (born 1978), British para athlete and former Lance Corporal
Darren Mapp (born 1980), Australian rugby league player
Eddie Mapp (c. 1910 – 1931), American musician
G. Walter Mapp (1873–1941), American lawyer and politician
Justin Mapp (born 1984), American soccer player
Kenneth Mapp (born 1955), American politician
Norman Mapp (1928–1988), American jazz singer and composer
Owen Mapp, New Zealand carver
Rhonda Mapp (born 1969), American basketball player
Sally Mapp (died 1737), English bonesetter
Wayne Mapp (born 1952), New Zealand politician